The list of shipwrecks in 1810 includes ships sunk, wrecked or otherwise lost during 1810.

January

3 January

4 January

5 January

6 January

7 January

10 January

11 January

12 January

13 January

14 January

15 January

16 January

17 January

19 January

20 January

21 January

22 January

23 January

24 January

25 January

26 January

27 January

28 January

30 January

Unknown date

February

1 February

5 February

6 February

8 February

9 February

11 February

12 February

13 February

15 February

16 February

18 February

19 February

20 February

21 February

23 February

24 February

25 February

26 February

28 February

Unknown date

March

1 March

2 March

3 March

4 March

5 March

7 March

8 March

9 March

10 March

11 March

13 March

14 March

15 March

16 March

20 March

21 March

23 March

24 March

25 March

26 March

29 March

30 March

Unknown date

April

2 April

3 April

4 April

5 April

9 April

11 April

12 April

14 April

16 April

18 April

24 April

25 April

26 April

Unknown date

May

2 May

3 May

5 May

6 May

7 May

8 May

9 May

11 May

14 May

20 May

26 May

27 May

28 May

30 May

31 May

Unknown date

June

1 June

3 June

5 June

7 June

14 June

16 June

19 June

20 June

21 June

27 June

Unknown date

July

12 July

17 July

22 July

23 July

24 July

25 July

27 July

29 July

Unknown date

August

3 August

7 August

9 August

10 August

11 August

12 August

13 August

15 August

16 August

17 August

20 August

22 August

23 August

26 August

29 August

30 August

31 August

Unknown date

September

1 September

5 September

6 September

7 September

8 September

10 September

11 September

14 September

16 September

18 September

20 September

22 September

23 September

24 September

25 September

26 September

27 September

28 September

29 September

30 September

Unknown date

October

1 October

2 October

3 October

7 October

9 October

10 October

13 October

14 October

15 October

16 October

17 October

19 October

20 October

21 October

22 October

23 October

24 October

25 October

26 October

27 October

28 October

30 October

31 October

Unknown date

November

1 November

2 November

3 November

4 November

5 November

6 November

7 November

8 November

9 November

10 November

11 November

12 November

13 November

14 November

15 November

16 November

17 November

18 November

19 November

20 November

21 November

23 November

25 November

26 November

27 November

28 November

29 November

30 November

Unknown date

December

1 December

2 December

4 December

5 December

8 December

10 December

11 December

12 December

13 December

14 December

15 December

18 December

19 December

20 December

21 December

22 December

23 December

24 December

25 December

26 December

27 December

28 December

29 December

30 December

31 December

Unknown date

Unknown date

References

1810